Leptarrhena is a genus of flowering plants belonging to the family Saxifragaceae.

Its native range is Subarctic America to Northwestern USA.

Species:
 Leptarrhena pyrolifolia (D.Don) Ser.

References

Saxifragaceae
Saxifragaceae genera